Qalaidasht is a village and jamoat in Tajikistan. It is located in Fayzobod District, one of the Districts of Republican Subordination. The jamoat has a total population of 12,074 (2015). It consists of 7 villages, including Elok.

Geography
Qalaidasht is on the Pamir Highway, 45 kilometers east of Dushanbe in the valley of the river Elok, a tributary of the Kofarnihon. It has a Köppen climate classification of Dsa and experiences wet and cold winters with dry cool summers.

Notes

References

Populated places in Districts of Republican Subordination
Jamoats of Tajikistan